Luis Javier González Fanegas (born 17 June 1969 in Madrid) is a retired Spanish middle-distance runner. He specialized in the 800 metres.

Achievements

References

1969 births
Living people
Spanish male middle-distance runners
Athletes from Madrid
Olympic athletes of Spain
Athletes (track and field) at the 1992 Summer Olympics
Mediterranean Games silver medalists for Spain
Mediterranean Games medalists in athletics
Athletes (track and field) at the 1991 Mediterranean Games
20th-century Spanish people